Cēsis District was an administrative division of Latvia, located in the Vidzeme region, in the country's north-east. It bordered the former districts of Valmiera and Valka to the north, Limbaži and Riga to the west, Gulbene to the east, Ogre and Madona to the south. It was organized into two cities, a municipality and twenty one parishes, each with a local government authority. The center of the district was the city of Cēsis.

Districts were eliminated during the administrative-territorial reform in 2009.

Cities, municipalities and parishes in the Cēsis District

 Amata Municipality
 Cēsis city
 Drusti Parish
 Dzērbene Parish
 Ineši Parish
 Jaunpiebalga Parish
 Kaive Parish
 Liepa Parish
 Līgatne city
 Līgatne Parish
 Mārsnēni Parish
 Nītaure Parish
 Priekuļi Parish
 Raiskuma Parish
 Stalbe Parish
 Straupe Parish
 Rauna Parish
 Skujene Parish
 Taurene Parish
 Vaive Parish
 Vecpiebalga Parish
 Veselava Parish
 Zaube Parish
 Zosēni Parish

See also
Kreis Wenden

References 

Districts of Latvia